Platycypha auripes is a species of damselfly in the family Chlorocyphidae. It is endemic to the Eastern Arc Mountains in Tanzania. It occurs in and around forest streams. It is threatened by habitat loss caused by agriculture and wood extraction.

References 

Chlorocyphidae
Odonata of Africa
Insects of Tanzania
Endemic fauna of Tanzania
Insects described in 1906
Taxonomy articles created by Polbot